Alfred Schmidtberger (January 21, 1930 – June 18, 2020) was an Austrian sprint canoer who competed in the 1950s. He won two bronze medals at the ICF Canoe Sprint World Championships, earning them in the K-1 4 x 500 m (1954) and the K-4 10000 m (1950) events. Schmidtberger also competed in two Summer Olympics, earning his best finish of ninth in the K-1 10000 m event at Helsinki in 1952.

References

Sources

Alfred Schmidtberger's profile at Sports Reference.com
Alfred Schmidtberger's obituary 

1930 births
2020 deaths
Austrian male canoeists
Canoeists at the 1952 Summer Olympics
Canoeists at the 1956 Summer Olympics
Olympic canoeists of Austria
ICF Canoe Sprint World Championships medalists in kayak